Try is the fourth studio album by contemporary Christian musician Bebo Norman. The album is the third with Essential Records, and his fifth album overall, including his first independent release. This album was released on August 24, 2004, and the producers are Brown Bannister, Matt Bronleewe and Mitch Dane.

Critical reception

AllMusic's Rovi said that "like a John Mayer or Jack Johnson for the Contemporary Christian set, Bebo Norman plays earthy, soulful, acoustic-based music honed though hard touring. As with the aforementioned artists, he tempers his classic sensitive singer/songwriter fare with a keen ear for pop melody and passionate delivery." In addition, Rovi wrote that the album is "a sure candidate for a CCM/pop crossover, Norman reveals himself as an artist primed and ready for the mainstream on TRY."

CCM Magazine'''s David McCreary said that "continuing in a similar vein is the decidedly organic, acoustic-driven project Try, Norman’s fourth studio release. In many ways the selections found here recall the unobtrusive nature of his earliest work, most notably the independent The Fabric of Verse. That’s not to say Norman has regressed musically; but, rather, that ostensibly he desires to remain true to the essence of his artistry." Furthermore, McCreary wrote that "another distinct difference evidenced on Try is the absence of expected tracks relating to singleness or longing for romance. It’s no coincidence that Norman’s affinity for such topics has shifted, given his recent departure from bachelorhood". McCreary went on to say that "by design, Norman and his production team have created a restrained yet magnetic sonic template intended to draw the listener in and not let go until the final note is played. And that’s exactly what happens each time this disc is spun."Christianity Today's Russ Breimeier said that "Try is unquestionably a good album, but it indicates an approach by Bebo Norman that is simpler, not more sophisticated."

Cross Rhythms' Alan Chesters said that the album is "generally concerned with searching for, finding and experiencing faith" and how "each song seems to fit him like a glove and with arrangements easy and varied on the ear, from ballad to up-tempo, there's not a dud track to be found."

Jesus Freak Hideout's John DiBiase said that "Try succeeds on many levels as Bebo Norman continues to write relevant and meaningful songs for listeners to associate with and worship along to. While maybe not as powerful in some respects as Myself..., Try'' marks a new chapter in the life of an incredible artist and musician, and like in any good book, continues to carry the listener along Bebo Norman's life story quite nicely."

Melodic's Pär Winberg said that "Bebo is one of my biggest favourites the last couple of years. His 3 latest albums have all three been a superb show in soft Midwestern singer songwriter rock. Add Bebo?s marvellous voice to the recipe and you all understand that I have some expectations on the guy. Unfortunately the new album is his weakest of the four. It feels quite uninspired and the songs are just there as a ?nice? background companion without grabbing the heart as his stuff use to do. The album is also far too soft and? nah? a major disappointment is what it is. Unfortunately."

Track listing

Personnel 
 Bebo Norman – lead vocals, acoustic guitar 
 Mitch Dane – Wurlitzer electric piano (1), acoustic guitar (1), vibraslap (1), electric guitar (2), drum programming (2, 10), percussion (5), Rhodes (6), acoustic piano (9), analog delay effects (9)
 Cason Cooley – acoustic piano (5, 6)
 Matt Bronleewe – keyboards (7), electric guitar (7), Wurlitzer electric piano (8)
 Jamie Kenney – keyboards (12)
 Ryan Booth – electric 12-string guitar (1), acoustic guitar (2), percussion (2)
 Stephen Mason – electric guitar (1, 4, 6), pedal steel guitar (1, 5), backing vocals (1), lap steel guitar (4), banjo (5), baritone guitar (6), mandolin (6)
 Kenny Meeks – acoustic guitar (1, 2), nylon guitar (1, 10), mandolin (2)
 Gabe Scott – lap steel guitar (2, 10), accordion (10)
 Bruce Gaitsch – acoustic guitar (3, 8, 11)
 Chris Graffagnino – electric guitar (3, 11)
 Paul Moak – acoustic guitar (12)
 Aaron Sands – bass (1, 2, 4, 6, 10)
 James Gregory – bass (3, 7, 8, 11, 12)
 Grant Norsworthy – bass (5)
 Andy Hubbard – drums (1, 2, 4, 5, 6, 10), percussion (1, 2, 10)
 Eric Darken – drums (3, 7, 8, 11)
 Dan Needham – drums (12)
 Matt Slocum – cello (2, 10)
 John Catchings – cello (8)
 Keith Getty – string arrangements and conductor (3, 11)
 Prague Philharmonic Orchestra – strings (3, 11)
 Dan Muckala – string arrangements (12)
 Anthony LaMarchina – cello (12)
 Chris Wilkinson – viola (12)
 David Angell – violin (12)
 David Davidson – violin (12)
 Charlie Lowell – backing vocals (1)
 Brandon Heath – backing vocals (2, 4, 6, 10), acoustic guitar (7)
 Jill Phillips – backing vocals (5)
 Ellie Holcomb – backing vocals (12)
 Michael Mellett – backing vocals (12)

Production 
 Producers – Mitch Dane (1, 2, 4, 5, 6, 9, 10); Matt Bronleewe (3, 7, 8, 11); Brown Bannister (12).
 Executive producer – Jordyn Conner
 Production coordinator on track 12 – Traci Sterling Bishir
 Orchestra technical producer on tracks 3, 11 – Joni McCabe
 Engineers – Mitch Dane (1, 2, 4, 5, 6, 9 & 10); Aaron Swihart (3, 7, 8 & 11); Steve Bishir (Track 12).
 Assistant Engineer on Tracks 3, 7, 8 & 11 – Michael Modesto
 Recorded at Sputnik Sound and Dark Horse Recording Studio (Franklin, TN); Pentavarit and Alex The Great Recording (Nashville, TN).
 Mixing – Richard Dodd (Tracks 1-11); Steve Bishir (Track 12).
 Mix Assistant on Tracks 1-11 – David Streit
 Mixed at Oxford Sound (Nashville, TN).
 Digital Editing – Dave Dillbeck and Bill Whittington 
 Mastered by Richard Dodd at RichardDodd.com
 A&R – Michelle Pearson 
 Art Direction – Stephanie McBrayer and Bebo Norman
 Cover Design, Package Design and Photography – Jeremy Cowart
 Management – Blanton Harrell Cooke & Corzine.

Charts

References

2004 albums
Bebo Norman albums
Essential Records (Christian) albums